Kucły-Kolonia  is distant outskirt (term: "colony" in Polish) of Rakówka village in the administrative district of Gmina Księżpol, within Biłgoraj County, Lublin Voivodeship, in eastern Poland.

References

Villages in Biłgoraj County